Charama is a Nagar Panchayat (Notified Area Council) city in the Kanker district (North Baster) of Chhattisgarh state, central India. The 2011 Census of India recorded 9,707 inhabitants in this town.

See also 
 Kanker district

References 

Cities and towns in Kanker district
Kanker district